Lee Hall may refer to:

People
 Lee Hall (artist) (1934–2017), American abstract painter, writer, educator, and former university president
 Lee Hall (playwright) (born 1966), English playwright and screenwriter
 Jesse Lee Hall (1849–1911), American Western lawman
 Lee Hall (died 1955), pilot of United Airlines Flight 629, destroyed by a bomb in 1955

Places
 Lee Hall, Virginia, a community within Newport News, Virginia
Lee Hall Mansion, the historic NRHP-listed house for which the community is named
Lee Hall Depot, the historic NRHP-listed train station that served the community from the late 19th to the late 20th century
 Lee Hall (Virginia Tech), a residence Hall on the campus of Virginia Tech
 Leigh Hall (Gainesville, Florida)
 Lee Hall, a building at Wolfson College, Cambridge, England

Hall, Lee